Lai-Sang Lily Young (born 1952) is a Hong Kong-born American mathematician who holds the Henry & Lucy Moses Professorship of Science and is a professor of mathematics and neural science at the Courant Institute of Mathematical Sciences of
New York University. Her research interests include dynamical systems, ergodic theory, chaos theory, probability theory, statistical mechanics, and neuroscience. She is particularly known for introducing the method of Markov returns in 1998, which she used to prove exponential correlation delay in Sinai billiards and other hyperbolic dynamical systems.

Education and career
Although born and raised in Hong Kong, Young came to the US for her education, earning a bachelor's degree from the University of Wisconsin–Madison in 1973. She moved to the University of California, Berkeley for her graduate studies, earning a master's degree in 1976 and completing her doctorate in 1978, under the supervision of Rufus Bowen. She taught at Northwestern University from 1979 to 1980, Michigan State University from 1980 to 1986, the University of Arizona from 1987 to 1990, and the University of California, Los Angeles from 1991 to 1999. She has been the Moses Professor at NYU since 1999.

Awards and honors
Young became a Sloan Fellow in 1985, and a Guggenheim Fellow in 1997.

In 1993, Young was given the Ruth Lyttle Satter Prize in Mathematics of the American Mathematical Society "for her leading role in the investigation of the statistical (or ergodic) properties of dynamical systems". This is a biennial award for outstanding research contributions by a female mathematician.

In 2004, she was elected as a fellow of the American Academy of Arts and Sciences.

Young was an invited speaker at the International Congress of Mathematicians in 1994, and an invited plenary speaker at the 2018 International Congress of Mathematicians.
In 2005, she presented the Noether Lecture of the Association for Women in Mathematics; her talk was entitled "From Limit Cycles to Strange Attractors". In 2007, she presented the Sonia Kovalevsky lecture, jointly sponsored by the AWM and the Society for Industrial and Applied Mathematics.

In 2020 she was elected a member of the National Academy of Sciences. She is the recipient of the 2021 Jürgen Moser Lecture prize "for her sustained and deep contributions to the theory of non-uniformly hyperbolic dynamical systems."

Selected publications
.
.
.
.
.
.
.

References

External links
 Young's Homepage
  (Plenary Lecture 8)
 Kevin Hartnett, A Mathematical Model Unlocks the Secrets of Vision, Quanta Magazine, 21 August 2019

1952 births
Living people
20th-century American mathematicians
20th-century women mathematicians
21st-century American mathematicians
21st-century women mathematicians
American women mathematicians
Courant Institute of Mathematical Sciences faculty
Dynamical systems theorists
Fellows of the American Academy of Arts and Sciences
Members of the United States National Academy of Sciences
Hong Kong emigrants to the United States
Hong Kong mathematicians
Michigan State University faculty
Northwestern University faculty
University of Arizona faculty
University of California, Berkeley alumni
University of California, Los Angeles faculty
University of Wisconsin–Madison alumni
20th-century American women
21st-century American women